Haworthiopsis sordida (synonym Haworthia sordida) is a succulent plant in the subfamily Asphodeloideae, found in the southern part of the Cape Provinces of South Africa.

References

sordida
Flora of the Cape Provinces